Benjamin Vogt is an author and garden designer who lives in Nebraska. 

He has a PhD in creative writing from the University of Nebraska-Lincoln. He owns Monarch Gardens LLC, a prairie garden design company in eastern Nebraska, and speaks nationally on garden design and landscape ethics at conferences and seminars.

Bibliography

 Prairie Up: An Introduction to Natural Garden Design 3 Fields Books, an imprint of the University of Illinois Press, 2023. 
 A New Garden Ethic: Cultivating Defiant Compassion for an Uncertain Future New Society Publishers. 2017. 
 Afterimage: Poems Stephen F. Austin State University Press. 2012.

References

Living people
1976 births
Writers from Lincoln, Nebraska
University of Nebraska–Lincoln faculty
21st-century American poets
Poets from Oklahoma
Poets from Minnesota
Poets from Indiana